Pselnophorus belfragei (Belfrage's plume moth) is a moth of the family Pterophoridae. It is found in the south-eastern United States, from South Carolina to Florida, west to Texas and Oklahoma.

Adults have light gray forewings with dark speckling and three or four black spots. The abdomen is light yellowish or yellowish-gray with sparse speckling. They are on wing year round.

The larvae feed on the leaves of Dichondra caroliniensis.

Etymology
It is named for Gustav Wilhelm Belfrage.

References

Moths described in 1881
Oidaematophorini
Endemic fauna of the United States
Moths of North America